John Brack (10 May 1920 – 11 February 1999) was an Australian painter, and a member of the Antipodeans group. According to one critic, Brack's early works captured the idiosyncrasies of their time "more powerfully and succinctly than any Australian artist before or since. Brack forged the iconography of a decade on canvas as sharply as Barry Humphries did on stage."

Life
During World War 2 (1940-1946) VX107527 Lieutenant John Brack served with the Field Artillery. Brack was Art Master at Melbourne Grammar School (1952–1962). His art first achieved prominence in the 1950s. He also joined the Antipodeans Group in the 1950s which protested against abstract expressionism. He was appointed Head of National Gallery of Victoria Art School (1962–1968), where he was an influence on many artists and the creation of the expanded school attached to the new gallery building.

Style
Brack's early conventional style evolved into one of simplified, almost stark, shapes and areas of deliberately drab colour, often featuring large areas of brown. He made an initial mark in the 1950s with works on the contemporary Australian culture, such as the iconic Collins St., 5 pm (1955), a view of rush hour in post-war Melbourne.  Set in a bleak palette of browns and greys, it was a comment on the conformity of everyday life, with all figures looking almost identical.  A related painting The Bar (1954) was modelled on Manet's 1882 A Bar at the Folies-Bergère, and satirised the six o'clock swill, a social ritual arising from the early closing of Australian pubs.  Most of these early paintings and drawings were unmistakably satirical comments against the Australian Dream, either being set in the newly expanding post-war suburbia or taking the life of those who lived there as their subject matter.

In the 1970s Brack produced a long series of highly stylised works featuring objects such as pencils in complex patterns. These were intended as allegories of contemporary life.

Period and themes
Brack's works cover a wide range topics and themes. He often did a series of works on a particular theme over a number of years. His portraits, including self-portraits, and portraits of family, friends and commissions, and his paintings of nudes were produced throughout his career.

 War time drawings (1943–1945)
 Scenes of urban life (Shops, street scenes etc.) (1952–
 Racecourse (1953–1956)
 School, the playground (1959–60)
 Wedding (1960–61)
 Shop Windows (1963–1977)
 Ballroom Dancers (1969)
 Gymnastics (1971–1973)
 Postcards and implements (1976–
 Pencils and pens (1981–
 Mannequins (1989–90)

The Art of John Brack by Sasha Grishin includes a catalogue raisonné of his work to 1990. The catalogue for the exhibition at Heide Museum of Modern Art in 2000 includes works to 1994.

Exhibitions and auctions

A major retrospective exhibition of Brack's work opened at the National Portrait Gallery in Canberra on 24 August 2007, National Portrait Gallery, Old Parliament House, 24 August 2007 – 18 November 2007.  the last major exhibition for the gallery before its relocation. Brack's widow, Helen Maudsley, an artist in her own right, attended the opening and commented that Brack was not concerned with the social standing of the sitter, but rather the artistic merit of their participation in the piece.

Brack's painting The Bar sold for $3.2 million in April 2006, while in May 2007 his painting The Old Time sold for $3.36 million at auction in Sydney, a record for a painting by an Australian artist.

 2020 'Laughing Child' (1958) was scheduled for auction in Sydney on 24 June 2020. It is a portrait of the artist's daughter Charlotte, aged four and is described as "one of Australian art's most compelling representations of childhood".
 2009 John Brack: Retrospective Exhibition, The Ian Potter Centre: NGV Australia
 2006–2007 'The Nude in the Art of John Brack', MacClelland Gallery and Sculpture Park, Langwarrin
 1999 'John Brack – Inside and Outside', works in the N.G.A. collection, National Gallery of Australia, Canberra
 1998 'John Brack and Fred Williams', Art Gallery of South Australia, Adelaide
 1987–88 'John Brack – A Retrospective', National Gallery of Victoria, Melbourne
 1981 'Drawings, 1945–79', Monash University Gallery, Melbourne
 1977 'Paintings and Drawings, 1945–77', Australian National University
 1977 'Selected Paintings, 1947–77', Royal Melbourne Institute of Technology Gallery, Melbourne

See also
 Australian art

Notes and references

Further reading
 Grishin, Sasha (1990) The Art of John Brack, Oxford University Press, Melbourne 2 Vols. (illustrated)  (v. 1);  (v. 2)
Hoff, Ursula, Robert Lindsay and Patrick McCaughey (1987) John Brack A Retrospective Exhibition, National Gallery of Victoria, Melbourne 
Millar, Ron John Brack, (1971) Lansdowne Press Melbourne. .

External links

 Self-portrait 1955
 John Brack at the Art Gallery of New South Wales
 
 The Sewing Machine 1955 at Ballarat Fine Art Gallery.
 John Brack at OnlyMelbourne
 Images of John Brack's prints at Prints and Printmaking .

1920 births
1999 deaths
Artists from Melbourne
Australian printmakers
20th-century Australian painters
20th-century Australian male artists
20th-century printmakers
Australian male painters
Australian military personnel of World War II
Military personnel from Melbourne
People from South Melbourne
National Gallery of Victoria Art School alumni
Melbourne Grammar School